Valuychik is a rural locality (a selo) and the administrative center of Valuychanskoye Rural Settlement, Krasnogvardeysky District, Belgorod Oblast, Russia. The population was 698 as of 2010. There are 4 streets.

Geography 
Valuychik is located 41 km southwest of Biryuch (the district's administrative centre) by road. Starokozhevo is the nearest rural locality.

References 

Rural localities in Krasnogvardeysky District, Belgorod Oblast